Elections to Southend-on-Sea Borough Council took place on 5 May 2022. This was on the same day as other local elections across the United Kingdom.

Results summary

Ward results

Belfairs

Blenheim Park

Chalkwell

Eastwood Park

Kursaal

Leigh

Milton

Prittlewell

Shoeburyness

Southchurch

St. Laurence

St. Luke's

Thorpe

Victoria

West Leigh

West Shoebury

Westborough

References

2022
Southend-on-Sea
May 2022 events in the United Kingdom
2020s in Essex